Sharif University of Technology (SUT) is a public research university in Tehran, Iran. It is widely considered as the nation's most prestigious and leading institution for science, technology, engineering, and mathematics (STEM) fields and is considered Iran's MIT among academics, scholars, and industry. 

Established in 1966 under the reign of Mohammad Reza Shah Pahlavi, it was formerly named the Aryamehr University of Technology and for a short period after the 1979 revolution, the university was called Tehran University of Technology. Following the revolution, the university was named after Majid Sharif Vaghefi.

Today, the university provides both undergraduate and graduate programs in 15 main departments. The student body consists of about 6,000 undergraduate students and 4,700 graduate students from all the 31 provinces of Iran. Funding for Sharif University is provided by the government and through private funding. Undergraduate admission to Sharif is limited to the top 800 of the 500,000 students who pass the national entrance examination administered annually by the Iranian Ministry of Science, Research and Technology.

In the 2013 Academic Ranking of World Universities Engineering/Technology and Computer Sciences rankings, SUT is ranked 5th in the Middle East. It is in the top 251–275 universities in the world and 37th in Asia in the 2014 Times Higher Education World University Rankings. In the 2014 Times Higher Education top 100 for newer universities (less than 50 years old), SUT ranked 1st in the Middle East, 6th in Asia, and 27th in the world.

Founded in 1966, SUT was established to train and supply part of the required expert human resources of the country on an equal level to credible universities of the world. Compared with other worldwide universities, it is a young and growing pioneer in both basic and applied sciences. The main aims of SUT are: (1) to create an organization where students can be instructed in both theoretical and applied sciences, with special emphasis on the particular needs of Islamic society; (2) to teach students the advanced knowledge and techniques required to participate in the fields of engineering and technology and to cultivate them into creative engineers, good scientists, and innovative technologists; and (3) to educate engineers who are ready to be employed, who contribute significantly to their jobs, and who have a strong sense of public responsibility and a desire to continue to learn. The emphasis is placed on the promotion of multidisciplinary research at the graduate and doctoral levels. Based on that, SUT provides a scientific and dynamic environment for those who are trying to gain knowledge. In other words, SUT is a place for those who are trying to understand and comprehend scientific realities and facts, and are trying to convey those to others.

History

The university was founded in 1966 with the name Aryamehr University of Industry by Mohammad Ali Mojtahedi. At that time, there were 54 faculty members and a total of 412 students who were selected by national examination. Also, only four departments were established:  Electrical, Metallurgical, Mechanical, and Chemical Engineering.
In 1972, Mohammad Reza Pahlavi appointed Sayyed Hosein Nasr as president of the university with the goal of modeling the school based on the Massachusetts Institute of Technology, but with roots in Iranian culture. In 1974 a new campus of the university was established in Isfahan. But later that campus became an independent university, named Isfahan University of Technology (IUT). The emblem of IUT still closely resembles SUT's emblem . Following the revolution, the university was named after Majid Sharif Vaghefi, who was one of the People's Mujahedin of Iran group's leaders who was killed by the members of a splinter group (later renamed to Peykar Organization) who had recently converted from Islam to Marxism and were adamant to forcefully change the Mujahedin's organization's ideology to Marxism.

Currently, the university has about 12,000 students and over 700 faculty members in 16 main departments. During the Mahsa Amini protests in 2022, many students participated, with video footage of the protest and subsequent response by Iranian security forces published first to social media and then by major news organizations. Iranian state news agency IRNA reported that at least 37 students were arrested and most were released shortly afterwards.

Campuses

Main campus
The main campus of the university is located in the Tarasht neighborhood, near Azadi Square, Tehran, Iran. It is located close to the Azadi Tower, which is the symbol of Tehran and one of the main transportation hubs. The endowment of Sharif University of Technology has been estimated at $25 million.

International campus
Sharif University also has an International Campus on Kish Island in Persian Gulf. The International Campus of Sharif University of Technology was established in 2005. Today there are two faculties active in this campus: Faculty of Engineering and Science, and Faculty of Management. The campus is currently admitting students for bachelor's, master's, and Ph.D. degrees in engineering courses and a master's degree in management.

Academic profile

Profile
Sharif University was established in 1966 as an Engineering university with departments of Electrical, Metallurgical, Mechanical, and Chemical Engineering. Currently, Sharif University has 14 science and engineering departments:

In engineering, Materials Science and Engineering, Chemical Engineering, Petroleum Engineering, Civil Engineering, Computer Engineering, Electrical Engineering, Industrial Engineering, Mechanical Engineering, and Aerospace engineering.

In science, Chemistry, Physics, Mathematical Science.

Other non-engineering departments include the School of Management and Economics, Languages and Linguistics Department, and the Department of Philosophy of Science which offers exclusively graduate degrees.

Affiliated research centers
The university has supported the establishment of Research Centers. These are usually started with a spin-off funding provided by or through university but will start to accept research and development projects from industry in their first months of establishment. Most of the employees of these centers are Sharif University students, while in some cases recent alumni or students of other universities have been recruited as well.

Following is a list of research centers affiliated with Sharif University.

 Advanced Communications Research Institute
 Advanced Information and Communication Technology Research Center (AICTC)
 Alborz Observatory for high energy cosmic and gamma rays
 Biochemical and Bio-environmental Research Center
 Condition Monitoring Center (CMC)
 Entrepreneurship Center
 Economical and Industrial Studies research Center
 Electronics Research Center
 Energy Technology Research Center
 Biochemical and Bioenvironmental Research Center(B.B.R.C)
 Green University: environmental research center
 Industrial Systems Research Center
 Institute for Nanoscience and Nanotechnology
 Institute for Transportation Studies and Research
 Sharif Applied Physics Research Center
 Water, Energy and Ocean Engineering Research Center
 Sharif Accelerator
 Sharif Incubator

World rankings
In the 2020 Academic Ranking of World Universities (also known as Shanghai Ranking), the university ranked between 501 and 600 in the world and first in Iran. According to the QS Ranking, Sharif University of Technology has stood in the first place of Iran and maintained its international rank 380th. In the 2022-2023 U.S. News & World Report Best Global University Ranking, the university ranked 598th in the world.

Research and endowment
Sharif University is a public university and its funding is provided by the government of Iran. For the top ranks of the national university entrance exam, education is free in all public universities. Those ranking lower are required to pay part or all of the tuition.

Industrial companies have supported Sharif University and provided research funding for the desired programs and projects. For instance, the Petroleum Engineering department was supported by Iran Oil industries .

Sharif University was appointed as a Center of Excellence (:fa:قطب علمی lit. Scientific Pole) by Iran's Ministry of Science and Technology in the fields of Advanced Materials, Aerospace Systems, Biological Process Engineering, Communication, Design, Robotics and Automation, Energy Conversion, Earthquake Engineering, Mathematics, Physics, Power System Management and Control, and Telecommunications, as well as Hydrodynamics and Dynamics of Marine Vehicles. This appointment is based on national standing based on research achievements and invested funding in the mentioned topics.

Student life

Political activities
Before the Islamic Revolution many political organizations including but not limited to Fadaian Khalg and People's Mujahedin of Iran active members and supporters were among students of the Sharif University. In the 14 years since its inception, many active members and supporters were arrested and killed by SAVAK among those Abdolmajid Pirzadeh Jahromi, Majid Ahmadzadeh (Fedaian Khlaq) can be named.

Through the student political movement after the 2nd of Khordad Movement, Sharif students were also actively involved. The major groups with political intentions at Sharif, during 1997–2003, were students Basij and the Association of Muslim students, briefly called Anjoman (Association). Most other smaller groups were allies of either Basij or Anjoman.
Basij was a serious opposer of Mohammad Khatami, the president of the time. Whereas, Anjoman was a loyal follower.
There have been several clashes between member students of the two groups. Free speech tribunes, occasionally end in harsh quarrel-like debates.
However, the major clash between Anjoman and Basij occurred while the student movement was in silence in most other universities. In 2006, a serious controversy resulting in physical tensions, occurred after Basij attempted to bury bodies of unknown Martyrs of the Iran–Iraq War at the universities' Mosque court.

Sharif University of Technology Association (SUTA)

Sharif alumni and affiliates are spread worldwide since many of them continue their graduate studies in Europe or North America and also some of them immigrated to these countries, therefore it is not easy to establish a local organization to be contacted by the alumni. Sharif University of Technology Association (SUTA) is a global organization that was formed in 2000 to facilitate communication and collaboration among the graduates, faculty, and staff of the Sharif University.

This non-profit organization is registered in the state of California, USA and has many chapters and affiliates around the world. Its mission is to enhance professional, academic, and social contacts among its membership, and to strengthen the ties between the association members living outside of Iran and the university.

Since 2000 SUTA has had a reunion/conference every other year, in the following cities: San Diego (California), Toronto (Canada), Heidelberg (Germany), Santa Clara (California), Vancouver (Canada), Gothenburg (Sweden), Ottawa (Canada) and Milan (Italy).

Faculty and alumni

Chancellors

Notable alumni
The university is known for its large number of alumni who join the academic world, including the late Maryam Mirzakhani, Professor of Mathematics at Stanford University and the first female to be awarded a Fields Medal.

Several SUT alumni have been active in the industry. Niloufar Salehi, computer scientist at University of California, Berkeley, Akbar Torkan, director of Petro-Pars Co. and previous Transportations Minister, Ahmad Ghalebaani, former managing director of SAIPA, Salman A. Avestimehr, an American-Iranian professor and co-director of the Communication Sciences Institute at the Electrical and Computer Engineering Department of Southern California, managing director of Iran national petroleum company can be named as some of the more famous alumni.

Many of the SUT alumni have entered in politics, including Mohammad Ali Najafi former minister of higher education and member of Tehran City Council, Es'hagh Jahangiri, former Minister of Industries and Mines, Abbas Mohtaj, former commander of Iranian Navy, Mohammad Atrianfar, former head of Tehran City Council, Morteza Alviri, former mayor of Tehran, Ali Larijani, speaker of Majlis and former presidential candidate and former head of IRIB and Mohsen Sazegara, former government official, political activist. Also, some of the opposition groups outside Iran have members who are SUT alumni. These members include Foad Mostafa Soltani, former leader of Komala political party of Iranian Kurdistan and Maryam Rajavi, president of People's Mujahedin of Iran Organization.

Multiple alumni of SUT also continued their careers as professional athletes. Having been affiliated with SUT's athletic teams, Ali Daei, former member and later head coach of Iranian national football team can be named. Adel Ferdosipour, the prominent football commentator and Elshan Moradi Chess Grandmaster are also SUT alumni.

Other publicly known figures with a Sharif related background include Peyman Yazdanian, music composer and Mohammad-Javad Larijani, director of Institute for Studies in Theoretical Physics and Mathematics.

Imprisoned human rights blogger Kouhyar Goudarzi was an aerospace student at Sharif until pressure from state security forces allegedly caused his dismissal. Omid Kokabee, an Applied Physics and Mechanics alumnus, was arrested while visiting Iran during his Postdoctoral research in University of Texas at Austin. He was sentenced to 10 years in prison for "communicating with a hostile government" and "illegitimate/illegal earnings."

See also
Higher education in Iran
Pardis Technology Park
Shahbal, unmanned aerial vehicle (UAV) developed at SUT
Iranian Machine Design Competition

References

External links

Sharif University of Technology's home page

 
1966 establishments in Iran
Educational institutions established in 1966
Engineering universities and colleges in Iran